In cricket, a five-wicket haul (also known as a "fifer") refers to a bowler taking five or more wickets in a single innings. This is regarded as a notable achievement, and  only 48 bowlers have taken 15 or more five-wicket hauls at the international level. Stuart Broada right-arm fast-medium bowleris a Test, One Day International (ODI) and Twenty20 International (T20I) cricketer who represents England. , Broad has taken 433 wickets in Test matches, 178 wickets in ODIs and 65 wickets in T20Is. , Broad has 20 five-wicket hauls across all formats in his international career and ranks twenty-eighth in the all-time list, and fourth in the equivalent list for England.

Broad made his Test debut against Sri Lanka during England's tour in 2007 with bowling figures of one wicket for 77 runs. His first five-wicket haul came against the West Indies during the first Test of the 2008–09 series at Sabina Park, taking five wickets for 85 runs in the first innings. His best bowling figures are eight wickets for 15 runs which he took in the first innings of the fourth and decisive Test of the 2015 Ashes series at Trent Bridge. Securing the five wickets in 19 deliveries, Broad equalled the fastest five-wicket haul in Test history, set in 1947 by Ernie Toshack for Australia against India, and recorded the best Test bowling figures ever at Trent Bridge, surpassing Muttiah Muralitharan's eight for 70 against England in June 2006. Broad has been most successful against Australia, taking eight Test five-wicket hauls.

Broad made his ODI debut against Pakistan during the latter's tour of England and Scotland in 2006. He took the only wicket of the second innings, that of Shoaib Malik, in a rain-curtailed match. His only five-wicket haul in the ODI format came against South Africa in 2008. Broad took five wickets for 23 runs in the match, which England won by 10 wickets. The performance earned him the man-of-the-match award. Broad made his first T20I appearance in 2008 and is yet to take a five-wicket haul in the format . His figures of four wickets for 24 runs against New Zealand in Auckland in 2013 remain his best in this variant of the game.

Key

Tests

One Day Internationals

Notes

References

English cricket lists
Lists of international cricket five-wicket hauls by player